Peter Ecklund (September 27, 1945 – April 8, 2020) was an American jazz cornetist.

Career
In 1967, Ecklund received a degree from Yale University. He went on tour with singer Paula Lockheart and started a jazz band, in addition to working with many pop and rock bands in the 1970s and 1980s. He became a substitute for the Nighthawks Orchestra led by Vince Giordano and a member of the Orphan Newboys led by Marty Grosz.

Ecklund died April 8, 2020 from Parkinson's disease.

Discography
 Peter Ecklund and the Melody Makers (Stomp Off, 1988)
 Laughing at Life with the Orphan Newsboys (Stomp Off, 1991)
 Ecklund at Elkhart (Jazzology, 1995)
 Strings Attached (Arbors, 1996)
 Christmas at the Almanac Music Hall with Howard Fishman (Almanac, 1999)

As guest
With David Bromberg
 Wanted Dead or Alive (Columbia, 1974)
 Midnight on the Water (Columbia, 1975)
 How Late'll Ya Play 'Til (Fantasy, 1976)
 Bandit in a Bathing Suit (Fantasy, 1978)
 You Should See the Rest of the Band (Fantasy, 1980)

With Marty Grosz
 Marty Grosz and the Keepers of the Flame (and the Imps) (Stomp Off, 1987)
 Unsaturated Fats (Stomp Off, 1990)
 On Revival Day (Jazzology, 1995)
 Going Hollywood (Stomp Off, 1997)

With Geoff Muldaur
 Pottery Pie (Reprise, 1968)
 Sweet Potatoes (Reprise, 1972)
 Blues Boy (Flying Fish, 1979)
 Private Astronomy (Edge Music, 2003)

With Leon Redbone
 Red to Blue (August, 1985)
 Sugar (Private Music, 1990)
 Whistling in the Wind (Private Music, 1994)

With others
 Paul Butterfield, Better Days (Bearsville, 1973)
 Doveman, With My Left Hand I Raise the Dead (Brassland, 2007)
 Bob Dylan, Tell Tale Signs (Columbia/Legacy, 2008)
 Howard Fishman, The Howard Fishman Quartet (Monkey Farm, 1999), Howard Fishman Quartet Vol. II (Monkey Farm, 2005), Moon Country (Monkey Farm, 2011)
 Steve Forbert, Steve Forbert (Epic, Nemperor, 1982)
 Gloria Gaynor, Glorious (Polydor, 1977)
 Steve Goodman, Words We Can Dance To (Asylum, 1976)
 Hello People, the Handsome Devils (ABC, 1974)
 Ian & Sylvia & the Great Speckled Bird, You Were on My Mind (Columbia, 1972)
 Keith Ingham, Just Imagine (Stomp Off,)
 Michael Jerling, My Evil Twin (Shanachie, 1992)
 George McCrae, Diamond Touch (T.K., 1976)
 Martin Mull, Martin Mull (Capricorn, 1972)
 Alex Pangman, Can't Stop Me from Dreaming (Sensation, 2001)
 Bonnie Raitt, Give It Up (Warner Bros., 1972)
 Tom Sancton, Tommy Sancton and the Galvanized Washboard Band (G.H.B.,)
 Cynthia Sayer, Jazz at Home (Jazzology, 1997)
 Cynthia Sayer Featuring Kenny Davern, Forward Moves (Yerba Buena,)
 Johnny Shines, Johnny Shines & Co. (Biograph, 1974)
 Johnny Shines, Mr. Cover Shaker (Biograph, 1992)
 Paul Siebel, Jack-Knife Gypsy (Elektra, 1971)
 Siegel–Schwall Band, 953 West (Wooden Nickel 1973)
 Eric Von Schmidt, 2nd Right 3rd Row (Poppy, 1972)
 Eric Von Schmidt, Eric Von Schmidt and the Cruel Family (Philo, 1978)
 Andrea True Connection, More, More, More (Buddah, 1976)
 Terry Waldo, Footlight Varieties (Stomp Off, 1990)
 Terry Waldo, Presents the Jazz Entertainers Vol. 1 Let It Shine (Stomp Off, 2003)
 Loudon Wainwright III, Social Studies (Hannibal, 1999)
 Loudon Wainwright III, High Wide and Handsome: The Charlie Poole Project (Proper, 2009)
 Mitch Woods, Mr. Boogie's Back in Town (Blind Pig, 1988)

References

External links
 

1945 births
2020 deaths
Jazz musicians from Connecticut
People from Woodbridge, Connecticut
American jazz cornetists
Neurological disease deaths in the United States
Deaths from Parkinson's disease
Stomp Off artists
Arbors Records artists